Boerhavia coccinea is a species of flowering plant in the four o'clock family which is known by many common names, including scarlet spiderling, red boerhavia, and in Spanish, hierba del cancer and hierba de la hormiga.

This is a widespread plant, whose native range is not certain, but probably includes the southwestern United States and parts of Mexico. It is present across the southeastern United States, where it may be naturalized. It is also present in Africa, Asia, Australia, and South America. It is present on many Pacific islands, including the Hawaiian Islands, where it is an invasive species and a noxious weed.

This plant grows in a wide variety of habitats, including disturbed areas as a common roadside weed. It is a low-lying, sprawling perennial herb producing reaching stems which can exceed a meter in length. The stems are somewhat hairy and sticky with glands. The generally oval-shaped leaves are held on short petioles. They are wavy along the edges and may have reddish margins. The inflorescence is a small head of tiny frilly flowers, each just a few millimeters long. The flowers are often bright scarlet to red-violet in color but can be shades of pink, yellow, or white.

Uses
The leaves and roots of B. coccinea are used medicinally in countries including Cameroon, Ethiopia, Namibia, Nigeria, Tanzania, Mexico, Brazil, Argentina, and Paraguay. It is also eaten by humans and used as animal feed. A flour can be made from its seeds.

References

External links
Jepson Manual Treatment
Photo gallery

coccinea
Flora of New South Wales
Flora of the Northern Territory
Flora of Queensland
Flora of South Australia
Eudicots of Western Australia
Taxa named by Philip Miller